The 2003 AFL Southern Tasmania (SFL) Premier League premiership season was an Australian Rules football competition, staged across Southern Tasmania, Australia over twenty-one roster rounds and six finals series matches between 5 April and 20 September 2003.
The competition's major sponsors for the season were Toyota and Hobart radio station Magic 107.3 FM 
Sorell Football Club went into recess prior to the season starting owing to a lack of board members and volunteers to run the club, as a consequence, the Eagles sat out the season and joined the AFLST Regional League the following year.

Participating Clubs
Brighton Football Club
Clarence District Football Club
Glenorchy District Football Club
Hobart Football Club
Kingston Football Club
New Norfolk District Football Club
North Hobart Football Club

2003 AFLST Premier League Club Coaches
 Des James (Brighton)
 Darren Winter (Clarence)
 John Klug (Glenorchy)
 Michael McGregor (Hobart)
 Adrian Goodwin (Kingston)
 Matthew Jones (New Norfolk)
 Brendon Bolton (North Hobart)

AFLST Premier League Reserves Grand Final
Clarence 16.14 (110) d New Norfolk 7.10 (52) at North Hobart Oval.

AFLST Premier League Under-18's Grand Final
New Norfolk 8.4 (52) d Clarence 6.6 (42) at North Hobart Oval.

2003 AFLST Premier League Leading Goalkicker
 Matthew Smith (New Norfolk) – 67

AFLST Premier League Reserves Leading Goalkicker
 Michael Eiszele (New Norfolk) – 41

AFLST Premier League Under-18s Leading Goalkicker
 Zac Webb (Glenorchy) – 35

Medal Winners
 Brendon Bolton (North Hobart) – William Leitch Medal (Seniors)
 Jason Green (New Norfolk) – George Watt Medal (Reserves)
 Adam Whitford (New Norfolk) – V.A Geard Medal (Under-18's)
 Brendon Bolton (North Hobart) – Weller Arnold Medal (Intrastate Game Medal)
 Robbie Devine (North Hobart) – Horrie Gorringe Medal (Best Player Premier League Grand Final)

2003 AFLST Premier League Ladder

Round 1
(Saturday, 5 April 2003) 
Clarence 19.16 (130) d Brighton 6.3 (39) at Pontville Oval.  
Hobart 16.6 (102) v Glenorchy 12.9 (81) at TCA Ground. 
New Norfolk 20.15 (135) v Kingston 7.3 (45) at Kingston Beach Oval. 
Bye: North Hobart.

Round 2
(Saturday, 12 April 2003) 
North Hobart 11.12 (78) d Clarence 10.11 (71) at Bellerive Oval. 
Hobart 12.11 (83) d New Norfolk 12.5 (77) at TCA Ground. 
Glenorchy 16.14 (110) d Kingston 9.2 (56) at KGV Football Park. 
Bye: Brighton.

Round 3
(Saturday, 19 April 2003) 
New Norfolk 17.9 (111) d Brighton 13.8 (86) at Boyer Oval 
Clarence 20.12 (132) d Kingston 10.12 (72) at Kingston Beach Oval. 
North Hobart 14.12 (96) d Glenorchy 8.14 (62) at KGV Football Park. 
Bye: Hobart.

Round 4
(Saturday, 26 April 2003) 
Hobart 15.18 (108) d Brighton 13.10 (88) at Pontville Oval. 
North Hobart 29.15 (189) d Kingston 9.8 (62) at North Hobart Oval. 
Clarence 18.13 (121) d Glenorchy 17.8 (110) at Bellerive Oval. 
Bye: New Norfolk.

Round 5
(Saturday, 3 May 2003) 
Clarence 6.21 (57) d Hobart 6.10 (46) at TCA Ground. 
New Norfolk 17.11 (113) d North Hobart 12.9 (81) at North Hobart Oval 
Glenorchy 14.13 (97) d Brighton 9.5 (59) at KGV Football Park 
Bye: Kingston.

Round 6
(Saturday, 10 May 2003) 
Hobart 14.8 (92) d North Hobart 7.11 (53) at North Hobart Oval. 
Clarence 22.11 (143) d New Norfolk 9.15 (69) at Bellerive Oval. 
Kingston 18.16 (124) d Brighton 12.8 (80) at Pontville Oval. 
Bye: Glenorchy.

Round 7
(Saturday, 17 May 2003) 
Hobart 26.9 (165) d Kingston 9.7 (61) at TCA Ground. 
North Hobart 18.18 (126) d Brighton 10.6 (66) at Pontville Oval. 
New Norfolk 15.15 (105) d Glenorchy 15.9 (99) at KGV Football Park. 
Bye: Clarence.

Round 8
(Saturday, 24 May 2003) 
Hobart 14.8 (92) d Glenorchy 10.7 (67) at TCA Ground. 
Clarence 27.20 (182) d Brighton 4.5 (29) at Bellerive Oval. 
New Norfolk 17.11 (113) d Kingston 5.6 (36) at Boyer Oval. 
Bye: North Hobart.

Round 9
(Saturday, 31 May 2003) 
New Norfolk 12.9 (81) d Hobart 7.9 (51) at Boyer Oval. 
Clarence 18.11 (119) d North Hobart 7.16 (58) at North Hobart Oval. 
Glenorchy 16.13 (109) d Kingston 6.7 (43) at Kingston Beach Oval. 
Bye: Brighton.

Round 10
(Monday, 9 June 2003) 
Clarence 13.10 (88) d New Norfolk 11.14 (80) at Boyer Oval. 
North Hobart 14.15 (99) d Hobart 11.13 (79) at KGV Football Park. 
Kingston 20.17 (137) d Brighton 13.8 (86) at Kingston Beach Oval. 
Bye: Glenorchy.

Round 11
(Saturday, 14 June 2003) 
New Norfolk 19.17 (131) d Brighton 5.4 (34) at Pontville Oval. 
Clarence 16.15 (111) d Kingston 3.9 (27) at Bellerive Oval. 
North Hobart 7.9 (51) d Glenorchy 7.6 (48) at KGV Football Park. 
Bye: Hobart.

Round 12
(Saturday, 21 June 2003) 
Hobart 16.13 (109) d Brighton 8.5 (53) at TCA Ground. 
North Hobart 13.16 (94) d Kingston 6.7 (43) at North Hobart Oval. 
Clarence 11.15 (81) d Glenorchy 11.12 (78) at KGV Football Park. 
Bye: New Norfolk.

Round 13
(Saturday, 28 June 2003) 
Clarence 17.14 (116) d Hobart 16.11 (107) at Bellerive Oval. 
Glenorchy 22.14 (146) d Brighton 7.7 (49) at Pontville Oval. 
New Norfolk 18.13 (121) d North Hobart 10.8 (68) at Boyer Oval. 
Bye: Kingston

Round 14
(Saturday, 5 July 2003) 
North Hobart 15.6 (96) d Hobart 13.12 (90) at TCA Ground. 
New Norfolk 15.6 (96) d Clarence 12.7 (79) at Bellerive Oval. 
Brighton 11.13 (79) d Kingston 8.6 (54) at Pontville Oval. 
Bye: Glenorchy.

Round 15
(Saturday, 12 July 2003) 
New Norfolk 15.13 (103) d Glenorchy 8.6 (54) at Boyer Oval. 
North Hobart 20.19 (139) d Brighton 9.11 (65) at North Hobart Oval. 
Hobart 19.12 (126) d Kingston 10.7 (67) at Kingston Beach Oval. 
Bye: Clarence.

Round 16
(Saturday, 19 July 2003) 
Clarence 24.18 (162) d Brighton 8.2 (50) at Pontville Oval. 
Glenorchy 16.15 (111) d Hobart 12.7 (79) at KGV Football Park. 
New Norfolk 28.16 (184) d Kingston 3.5 (23) at Kingston Beach Oval. 
Bye: North Hobart.

Round 17
(Saturday, 26 July 2003) 
New Norfolk 16.11 (107) d Hobart 11.9 (75) at TCA Ground. 
Clarence 18.14 (122) d North Hobart 9.7 (61) at Bellerive Oval. 
Glenorchy 22.18 (150) d Kingston 7.5 (47) at KGV Football Park. 
Bye: Brighton.

Round 18
(Saturday, 2 August 2003) 
New Norfolk 31.11 (197) d Brighton 7.10 (52) at Boyer Oval. 
North Hobart 17.13 (115) d Glenorchy 9.14 (68) at North Hobart Oval. 
Clarence 24.26 (170) d Kingston 6.6 (42) at Kingston Beach Oval. 
Bye: Hobart.

Round 19
(Saturday, 9 August 2003) 
Clarence 10.22 (82) d Hobart 9.9 (63) at Bellerive Oval. 
Glenorchy 22.12 (144) d Brighton 2.8 (20) at KGV Football Park. 
North Hobart 11.9 (75) d New Norfolk 10.9 (69) at North Hobart Oval. 
Bye: Kingston.

Round 20
(Saturday, 16 August 2003) 
Clarence 16.10 (106) d Glenorchy 12.15 (87) at Bellerive Oval. 
Hobart 14.13 (97) d Brighton 8.11 (59) at Pontville Oval. 
North Hobart 22.8 (140) d Kingston 16.9 (105) at Kingston Beach Oval. 
Bye: New Norfolk.

Round 21
(Saturday, 23 August 2003) 
Kingston 14.11 (95) d Hobart 7.11 (53) at TCA Ground. 
North Hobart 20.19 (139) d Brighton 8.12 (60) at Pontville Oval. 
New Norfolk 20.19 (139) d Glenorchy 16.12 (108) at KGV Football Park. 
Bye: Clarence.

Elimination Final
(Saturday, 30 August 2003) 
Hobart: 5.3 (33) | 5.4 (34) | 7.4 (46) | 9.6 (60) 
Glenorchy: 1.2 (8) | 1.2 (8) | 3.7 (25) | 5.8 (38) 
Attendance: N/A at TCA Ground

Qualifying Final
(Saturday, 30 August 2003) 
North Hobart: 1.3 (9) | 1.8 (14) | 5.8 (38) | 10.10 (70) 
New Norfolk: 3.2 (20) | 4.6 (30) | 6.7 (43) | 7.9 (51) 
Attendance: N/A at Boyer Oval.

First Semi Final
(Saturday, 6 September 2003) 
Hobart: 4.0 (24) | 9.1 (55) | 16.5 (101) | 19.6 (120) 
New Norfolk: 1.2 (8) | 4.5 (29) | 5.7 (37) | 10.9 (69) 
Attendance: 1,300 at Boyer Oval.

Second Semi Final
(Sunday, 7 September 2003) 
North Hobart: 0.0 (0) | 0.0 (0) | 0.0 (0) | 16.20 (116) 
Clarence: 0.0 (0) | 0.0 (0) | 0.0 (0) | 12.7 (79) 
Attendance: 10,073 at Bellerive Oval.* 
Note: This match was played as a curtain-raiser to the Tasmania Devils v Port Melbourne VFL Semi Final.

Preliminary Final
(Saturday, 13 September 2003) 
Hobart: 3.1 (19) | 8.1 (49) | 11.7 (73) | 13.10 (88) 
Clarence: 2.1 1(3) | 6.5 (41) | 10.11 (71) | 12.15 (87) 
Attendance: 1,300 at North Hobart Oval.

Grand Final
(Saturday, 20 September 2003) 
North Hobart: 3.2 (20) | 6.9 (45) | 15.13 (103) | 21.20 (146) 
Hobart: 3.4 (22) | 5.5 (35) | 5.6 (36) | 5.6 (36) 
Attendance: 4,289 at North Hobart Oval.

References
 2003 AFL Southern Tasmania Premier League Semi Final matchday program (Pages 2, 3, 22, 23, 24, 27, 38 and 39)
BigFooty https://www.bigfooty.com/forum/threads/previous-sfl-seasons.1184338/

External links
 Official SFL Website

2003
2003 in Australian rules football